The Apple community is a group of people interested in Apple Inc. and its products, who report information in various media. Generally this has evolved into a proliferation of websites, but latterly has also expanded into podcasts (both audio and video), either speculating on rumors about future product releases, simply report Apple-related news stories, or have discussions about Apple's products and how to use them.

Such stories and discussions may include topics related to physical products like the Macintosh and iOS devices (e.g., the iPhone, iPod, and iPad); software and operating systems, like Final Cut Pro, Logic Pro X, iWork, iOS, and macOS; or even services Apple offers like iCloud, iTunes Store, or Apple Music. Apple enjoys a cult-like following for its platforms, especially following the massive increase in popularity for the brand brought about by the huge increase in sales for all its products that started around the time the company introduced the original iPod in late 2001. The mass usage of computing devices in everyday life, mixed with Apple's vertical integration of its products and services, has helped to bring about this increase in popularity, and combined with a tight-lipped corporate policy about future products, helped foster an interest in the company's activities.

Sites and publishers
The Apple community is made up of several websites which exclusively, or almost exclusively, specialize in Apple products. Some have ceased operation, but a great many continue to run successfully.

In addition to these purely Apple info sites, most other mainstream technology journalism sites, including Ars Technica, CNET, Engadget, Gizmodo, iFixIt, Slashdot, and GigaOM include Apple sections, and many prominent bloggers also talk extensively about Apple products, including John Gruber's DaringFireball.

9to5Mac
9to5Mac was founded in 2007 by Seth Weintraub as an Apple news website originally focused on Macs in the enterprise. Since then, the website has expanded to covering all things Apple. 9to5Mac is known as the leading website within the Apple News Community in terms of breaking impactful news. The site gained fame in its earlier years for publishing the first photos of the third-generation iPod nano, the original iPod touch, early photos of the first iPhone, and details about Apple's still-in-use aluminum manufacturing process for laptops. In recent years, 9to5Mac published the first accurate details about the iPhone 4S, Siri, Apple's move from Google Maps to Apple Maps, new health and fitness applications, OS X/macOS updates, and the Apple Watch. The site also published the first photos of the white iPad 2, iPhone 5, and the iPad Air.

iMore
iMore is an Apple-enthusiast website founded in 2008, previously as Phonedifferent, with its main focus on all aspects of Apple devices (also featuring sections on several other platforms). Gerald Lynch is the current editor in chief. It was run by editor-in-chief Rene Ritchie with a small editing staff until 2020; Joseph Keller was the editor until mid-2022.  Along with the usual news and rumors, iMore often features in-depth technical details of Apple software and operating systems, aimed at explaining to readers how and why certain things have been done by Apple, in their wider context of achieving better usability and design goals.

Low End Mac 
Low End Mac is an Apple-centric website founded in 1997 to support Mac users with early Mac hardware and growing over time to cover the entire range of Macs, as each line eventually had model years falling into the “vintage and obsolete” category. Low End Mac's primary focus is on aging Apple gear, primarily Macs, but touching on iPhone, iPad, iPod, Apple TV, and other devices as well. It is published by its founder Daniel Knight with a small volunteer writing staff.

MacDailyNews
MacDailyNews has been published since September 2002,  years ago. MacDailyNews was cited by CNet as its source for the launch of the first Verizon (CDMA-capable) iPhone after Christmas, 2010; the phone was announced by Verizon in early 2011. The site was also cited by DaringFireball as the source for AT&T's best yet iPhone launch in 2009. It was also cited by MacRumors with a forecast for the second generation Mac Pro in April 2013; Apple announced it in June.

MacDevelopers
MacDevelopers is a site hosted for Apple Developers who code in Objective-C and Swift (programming language). The website also publishes articles regarding Apple's latest products and rumors. Usually the site gets its traffic from Apple developers. There is a slight increase in the traffic during the Worldwide Developers Conference event or when there is a major iOS or macOS update.

MacIssues
MacIssues is the renewal of what began in March 1996 as "MacFixIt," an update site for Ted Landau's Mac troubleshooting book "Sad Macs, Bombs and Other Disasters". The site was originally called "The Sad Macs Update Site" but was renamed to MacFixIt after hosting problems. The site has changed hands, being sold to TechTracker in July 2000, which was purchased by CNET in 2007. With CBS Interactive's acquisition of CNET in 2008, MacFixIt was integrated into the main CNET blog structure. MacFixIt was discontinued by CNET, but the site has spawned MacIssues.com, which continues to offer daily Mac-related troubleshooting, how-to, and review articles, and is written primarily by Christopher (Topher) Kessler.

MacOS Rumors 
MacOS Rumors was founded by Ethan C. Allen in 1995 as the first known "Apple rumors" website on the early web. His early work was noticed and referenced by other print media including CNET, Forbes, and Mac the Knife in MacWEEK. Allen was only 16 at the time but had developed extensive source contacts. Apple, at the time, was unhappy with some of the releases on the site which proved to be early and accurate. Apple contacted Allen a number of times requesting he stop releasing data from his sources. After a brief shutdown of the site at the request of Apple, the MacOS Rumors site was obtained by Ryan Meader after a domain expiration within two years of its creation. Originally with Ethan, the site posted most of its rumors based on screenshots and info sent via email from followers. With Ryan at the helm, MacOS Rumors collected content from message boards and usenet posts but later claimed (unsubstantiated) to have developed contacts inside Apple. After a number of successful years, MacOS Rumors gained a reputation for being inaccurate. Meader had allowed the MacOS Rumors domain name to expire around July 16, 2007, but then renewed the domain for another nine years. In the past half-decade, the site hasn't been updated at all and has no current staff.

After the MacOS Rumors site was obtained by Ryan in 1997, Ethan tried to briefly return to Apple rumors with his sources by creating a new website titled Mac Rumor Mill. Apple quickly caught onto the new site and was able to shut it down with threatened legal action.

MacRumors

MacRumors was launched in February 2000 by Arnold Kim, as an aggregator of Mac-related rumors and reports around the web. MacRumors attempts to keep track of the rumor community by consolidating reports and cross-referencing claims.

Macworld

Macworld is one of the oldest magazine publications focused on Apple products and software, starting in 1984. It received competition with the launch of MacUser the following year. The two magazines merged under the "Macworld" name in 1997. In September 2014 it discontinued its print edition, instead focusing on its website and YouTube coverage only.

SecureMac

SecureMac was founded in 1999 as a Mac-oriented security news portal. The site has expanded to cover a wide range of digital security and privacy topics, but has retained its focus on Apple products and software. In 2016, SecureMac launched The Checklist, a weekly security-themed podcast aimed at iOS and macOS users. SecureMac has been credited with discovering several significant macOS threats, including the Boonana Trojan, a new variant of the rogue security program Mac Defender.

Think Secret

Think Secret appeared in 1999. Apple filed a lawsuit against the company alleging it printed stories containing Apple trade secrets. In December 2007 the lawsuit was settled with no sources being disclosed; however, the site was shut down, finally closing on February 14, 2008.

In the year leading up to the closing of the site, Think Secret correctly predicted an aluminum shell iMac, development of a touchscreen based iPod starting in 2006, and the relative BlackBerry-esque form factor of the new iPod Nano. However, there were still some reports that turned out to be false, such as its prediction of the demise of the Mac Mini, when it received an upgrade in mid-2007, albeit with no fanfare.

TUAW (The Unofficial Apple Weblog)

The Unofficial Apple Weblog (TUAW) was founded in 2004, and claimed to be "a resource for all things Apple and beyond". TUAW published news stories, credible rumors, and how-tos covering a variety of topics daily. TUAW was known for its rumor roundups, seeking to dispel false Apple rumors from around the web. On February 3, 2015, TUAW was shut down by its owners, Weblogs, Inc.

Macintosh User Groups 

Macintosh User Groups (MUGs) are a group of people who use Macintosh computers made by Apple Inc. or other manufacturers and who use the Apple Macintosh operating system (OS). These groups are primarily locally situated and meet regularly to discuss Macintosh computers, the macOS, software and peripherals that work with these computers. Some groups focus on the older versions of macOS, up to macOS 9, but the majority now focus on the current version of macOS, macOS Big Sur. These user groups began with the formation of the Apple User Group Connection.

The Mac Observer 
The Mac Observer is a website that publishes Mac, iPhone, and Apple related news, reviews, tips, and podcasts. The site was launched on December 29, 1998 by Dave Hamilton and Bryan Chaffin. The site has evolved from just providing news and reviews to now hosting popular podcasts, columns, and more.

History

The macobserver.com domain was registered on December 17, 1998  and the site launched on December 29 of that same year. The Mac Observer came into existence when Dave Hamilton and Bryan Chaffin acquired Webintosh from Dan Hughes, an Apple-focused site which ran for three years prior.

Podcasts

Starting in 2005, The Mac Observer has been developing its own podcasts and continues producing them to this day. Current podcasts include Mac Geek Gab (hosted by Dave Hamilton and John F. Braun), Media+(hosted by Charlotte Henry), The Apple Context Machine (hosted by Bryan Chaffin), and The Mac Observer's Daily Observations (hosted by Kelly Guimont).

Country-specific

France 
Until 2007, the Apple Expo trade show was held yearly in Paris, and attended by Apple, which held a number of keynotes at the Expo.

Former Macintosh division lead Jean-Louis Gassé, a Frenchman, was notable in France as an advocate for personal computing, and contributed to Apple's "remarkable" success in that country.

French Apple news sites include:

 
 
 
 

In 1996, Macworld bought Golden magazine, and renamed it Macworld France. Two years later, it was renamed  after merging with the  magazine; in 2003, the French version of the magazine changed its name to Macworld. Bernard Le Du, a French Macworld journalist, later started his own magazine, .  is another notable French magazine, which went online-only in 2017.

Apple evangelist
An Apple evangelist, also known as Mac(intosh) evangelist or Mac advocate, is a technology evangelist for Apple products.

The term "software evangelist" was coined by Mike Murray of the Macintosh division. Apple's first evangelist was Mike Boich, a member of the original Macintosh development team. Alain Rossmann succeeded him. Their job was to promote Apple products, primarily by working with third-party developers. Boich and Rossmann later took part in the founding of Radius together.

One prominent Apple evangelist is Apple Fellow Guy Kawasaki. Kawasaki is credited as being one of the first to use evangelistic methods to promote a computer platform through a blog. Apple formerly had a "Why Mac?" evangelist site. The page no longer exists, but the company subsequently ran Get a Mac, which gave numerous reasons why "PC users" should switch to Macs. Several third-parties still host and maintain Apple evangelism websites, many of which are listed above. The AppleMasters program was a similar endeavor in the late nineties.

In the early days of the Macintosh computer, the primary function of an evangelist was to convince software developers to write software products for the Macintosh. When software developers need help from within Apple, evangelists will often act as go-betweens, helping the developers to find the right people at Apple to talk to. This role is now filled by the Apple Developer program, led by Phil Schiller.

Apple's response
Apple's official stance on speculation around any future product releases, is that they do not directly comment on such speculation nor discuss any products, until they are finally released. Historically, Apple has often used legal means, such as cease and desist orders, in order to retain trade secrets, intellectual property, or confidential corporate information, when needed. Typically, Apple has primarily pursued the leakers of information themselves, rather than any sites containing rumors on their products. However, Apple's suit against Think Secret in 2005 targeted whether these sites have the right to knowingly publish this protected information. Staff are also required to sign non-disclosure clauses within the company.

During his January 10, 2006 keynote address to the Macworld Conference & Expo in San Francisco, Apple's then CEO Steve Jobs poked fun at the rumors community by pretending to create a "Super Secret Apple Rumors" podcast during his demonstration of new features in GarageBand.

On October 16, 2014 at an Apple Special Event keynote, Craig Federighi pretended to "triple down on secrecy" by hiring Stephen Colbert as "Supreme Commander of Secrecy." He poked fun at the "spaceship" rumors.

See also

 Rumor

References

Community
Macintosh websites
Apple Inc. user groups
Fandom